The Holly Lodge Estate is a housing estate in Highgate, north London.

Early history
Holly Lodge Estate is located on the site and grounds of a house built in 1798 by Sir Henry Tempest on the south-facing slopes of Highgate, London adjacent to Highgate Rise, now known as Highgate West Hill. The estate lands included Traitor's Hill, reputedly where members of the Gunpowder Plot had met to watch the Palace of Westminster blow up, although the rumour is now known to be false. This "villa", a term then used for a compact country house easily accessible to London, was later to be known as The Holly Lodge and in 1809 a young actress, Harriot Mellon, took over the lease on the property. She married the banker Thomas Coutts in 1815 and enlarged the house and grounds by buying adjacent properties. The grounds were landscaped by John Buonarotti Papworth in 1825. When Harriot Mellon died in 1837 she left the house and her fortune to her step-granddaughter.

Angela Georgina Burdett-Coutts married late in life, and after her death her husband put the property on the market. Being four miles (6 km) from the City, it failed to sell and in 1907 was put on the market again, divided into several lots. It still failed to sell and it was not until 1922, after the death of her husband, that even outlying parts of the estate were sold: South Grove House and Holly Terrace to the North (the latter mostly unchanged in appearance since then) and Brookfield Stud to the south (now replaced by housing). Finally, in March 1923, the remaining portion of the estate, which was then always known as the Holly Lodge Estate, was sold for £45,000 and later resold to London Garden Suburbs Limited for the same price, with construction on the first street of homes, on Bromwich Avenue, beginning later that same year by the Central London Building Company Limited. The former lodge was demolished during the building of the new roads of houses and no trace of the building now remains, apart from a plaque at the entrance to the gardens taken from the north wall.

Character of the Estate
Initially, the plan was to build houses on the entire estate, creating a new housing estate, but due to slow sales and the need for drainage from the higher ground, the land to the east of the new central road was instead acquired by Lady Workers' Homes Limited to build blocks of rooms for single women moving to London in order to work as secretaries and clerks.

The local alderman and others involved in the project are commemorated in an inscription on the ornamental pond in the central garden area.

The estate now lies in a conservation area.
 and there has been a programme of regeneration.

Private roads
Built as an early gated community, the estate currently has two main access roads, the upper one to Highgate West Hill closing every night until mid-morning, the lower one to Swains Lane being closed randomly with access then controlled by estate staff. This maintains the private status of the estate roads and stops a right of way being created.

Acquisition as social housing
Ownership of the mansion blocks was transferred a number of times and, by the early 1960s under the ownership of Peachey Properties, many of the blocks were in a state of disrepair. The Metropolitan Borough of St Pancras took them over on a 150-year lease in 1964 which devolved to the London Borough of Camden the following year. Whilst Camden looks after the mansion blocks and the gardens in between the blocks, the remainder of the estate is managed and maintained by the Holly Lodge Estate Committee. The whole area remains a private estate and has been a Conservation Area since June 1992. Between 2004 and 2006 Sprunt Architects were responsible for a comprehensive programme of refurbishment works with the residents in occupation in which the exteriors of all the mansion blocks were renovated.

As the bedsitting rooms and flats in the Makepeace Avenue and Oakeshott Avenue mansion blocks were built without kitchens, a block was built at 30 Makepeace Avenue to serve as a centre for the community and included a restaurant, reading and meeting rooms and a small theatre. Behind it were three lawn tennis courts (with another two below Langbourne Avenue) where annual tennis tournaments were held.

Towards the late 1950s this community block fell into decline and by the time Camden bought their lease on the mansion blocks it was derelict. After a Lands Tribunal,  the block with its unique facilities was demolished and a new building with 25 one-person flats for the elderly, together with some communal facilities, was constructed on the site. Minutes of the Council at the time state that the community facilities would be replaced in the new building; however, this failed to materialise and only a small community centre on the ground floor now serves the estate.

For many years Camden retained the policy of only placing women on the estate but that has since lapsed. The only known other estate built for single women was in Wandsworth but has since been demolished.

Design
Langbourne Mansions was built first and provided 88 self-contained flats which have changed little in the intervening years. The mansion blocks on Makepeace Avenue and Oakeshott Avenue though were designed from the outset as bed-sitting rooms, sometimes with bedroom or kitchen alcoves, and offered an acceptable way for single women to live near to London on their own. Only three flats in the whole of Makepeace Mansions and Holly Lodge Mansions had their own bathroom (one for a particular tenant, one for the caretaker and the remaining one for the stoker for the central boiler). The remainder all had shared bathroom and toilet facilities, which is still the case for seven of the blocks even today. Makepeace Mansions originally provided 269 rooms and Holly Lodge Mansions on Oakeshott Avenue had 408 flats but later conversions have seen this number reduced as bedsits have given way to self-contained flats. New regulations have seen a start on the conversion of the remaining bedsits to self-contained accommodation during 2005.

The design of the mansion blocks on each avenue follow the same design concept with variations from group to group. From a distance they appear as 'Tudor Cliffs' as they tower above the adjoining houses and which is aided by the topography with not only the fall of the hill to the south but also to the east adjoining Highgate Cemetery.

The blocks are four or five stories in height and are united by timber details, gable roofs with finials, red tiles and casement windows usually with south-facing balconies. The rear and side elevations are in a very different plain and minimal style and overall reflect the modern design of the 1920s rather than the use of the vernacular.

In fiction
The original house and estate are used as a location in Kristen Callihan's book Moonglow.

References

External links
 hle.org.uk, Residents' web site with news, events and future plans.

See also
 The Buildings of England London 4: North. Bridget Cherry and Nikolaus Pevsner. .

Housing estates in the London Borough of Camden
Highgate